The Battle of Bangui occurred in March 2013, during the ongoing Central African Republic Civil War, and resulted in Séléka taking power in the Central African Republic. With the Central African Armed Forces and international soldiers absent, most of the resistance was raised by South African soldiers.

Background 
On 18 March 2013, the rebels, having taken over Gambo and Bangassou, threatened to take up arms again if their demands for the release of political prisoners, the integration of their forces into the national army and for South African soldiers to leave the country, were not met within 72 hours. Three days later, they took control of the towns of Damara and Bossangoa.

Battle 
On 23 March Séléka rebels entered Bangui's outskirts. At 19:00 Christian Narkoyo, spokesman of Séléka, announced that rebel forces had crossed the PK12 neighbourhood with little resistance. Rebels also cut electricity from city by turning off Bouali power plant. In reaction to rebel advancements, French forces secured Bangui airport. At 8:15 on 24 March fighting erupted in the city centre. At 8:48 Djouma Narkoyo announced that rebels had captured the presidential palace and that President François Bozizé had fled.  By 12:00 it was announced that the rebels controlled the entire city with only some pockets of resistance remaining. On 18:31 Michel Djotodia declared himself new President of the country.

References 

Central African Republic Civil War
Battles involving South Africa
2013 in the Central African Republic
Conflicts in 2013
Battles in 2013